Josh Phillips (born 19 December 1962, Rochester, Kent, England) is a rock keyboardist and composer. He first played Hammond organ with Procol Harum in 1993 and was the band's organist from 2004 until they disbanded in 2022, both times replacing the bands original organist Matthew Fisher.

He began his career at sixteen playing organ on the soundtrack to Quadrophenia, and he later appeared in the film with his band Cross Section. 
From 1983 to 1984 he was the keyboardist for Diamond Head. He has written for and/or performed with a wide range of musicians, including Big Country, Leo Sayer, Pete Townshend, The Crazy World of Arthur Brown, Kenney Jones, Starlite Campbell Band, Ronan Keating, Alisha's Attic, Heatwave, Midge Ure, Eric Clapton and Paul McCartney.

Along with Dan McGrath he has composed title themes and incidental music for many TV shows including Strictly Come Dancing and Take Me Out.   For the US version of "Strictly Come Dancing", "Dancing with the Stars", they have received numerous ASCAP Awards.  He also has songwriting credits on Procol Harum's 2017 album Novum. He is the co-writer of "Suburban House" with Andrew Brel, recorded by Leo Sayer.

He is the same person as Josh/Jonathan Phillips-Gorse, and had many album credits under that name from the 1980s.

References

External links

Procol Harum.com biography of Josh Phillips
Josh Phillips at IMDb
Josh Phillips (British Academy of Songwriters Composers and Authors)
Cross Section – The lost band of Quadrophenia are back
Rob Mostert interview with Josh Phillips

1962 births
Living people
people from Rochester, Kent
English rock keyboardists
Procol Harum members